"Statues Without Hearts" is a song written and recorded by American country music artist Larry Gatlin.  It was released in October 1976 as the third single from the album High Time.  The song reached number 5 on the Billboard Hot Country Singles & Tracks chart.

Chart performance

References

1977 singles
1976 songs
Larry Gatlin songs
Monument Records singles
Songs written by Larry Gatlin